Kang Hae-eun (born 9 July 1977) is a South Korean taekwondo practitioner. 

She won a gold medal in lightweight at the 1997 World Taekwondo Championships in Hong Kong. She won a gold medal in featherweight at the 1999 World Taekwondo Championships in Edmonton.

References

External links

1977 births
Living people
South Korean female taekwondo practitioners
World Taekwondo Championships medalists
Asian Taekwondo Championships medalists
20th-century South Korean women